Chromosome 19 open reading frame 18 (c19orf18) is a protein which in humans is encoded by the c19orf18 gene. The gene is exclusive to mammals and the protein is predicted to have a transmembrane domain and a coiled coil stretch.  This protein has a function that is not yet fully understood by the scientific community.

Gene 

Aliases of this gene include MGC41906 and LOC147685. The gene is located on chromosome 19 at 19q13.43.  The gene spans from 58,485,905 bp to 58,469,805 bp on the minus strand and contains 6 exons and 5 introns. Transcription of this gene produces one spliced mRNA which codes for the protein c19orf18.

Expression 

C19orf18 is ubiquitously expressed at moderate levels. In humans, there is higher expression in the testis, prostate, lung, liver, pancreas, uterus, heart, and other connective tissues.

Homology

Paralogs 
There are no known paralogs of this gene in the human genome.

Orthologs 
The gene is exclusive to mammals. The transmembrane domain is the most conserved region among close orthologs and distant homologs. The following table presents some of the orthologs found using searches in BLAST. This list does not contain all of the orthologs for c19orf18. It is meant to display the diversity of species for which orthologs are found. They are sorted by date of divergence and then protein similarity.

Protein 
The coding sequence contains 215 amino acids. The molecular weight of c19orf18 is 24.151 kdal and the isoelectric point for the unphosphorylated state is 9.06. The protein sequence is rich in leucine and is deficient in tryptophan, cysteine, and tyrosine. There is a negative charge cluster from amino acid 149 to 172.

Structure 

There is a cross-program consensus between GOR4, CFSSP, and PHYRE2 that the protein structure contains mostly coiled regions and alpha helices.

Topology 
The protein sequence is predicted to contain a signal peptide (1 aa to 24 aa), an extracellular domain (25 aa to 100 aa), a transmembrane domain (101 aa to 121 aa), and a cytoplasmic domain (122 aa to 215 aa).

Subcellular localization 
PSORTII and CELLO predicted that the human protein would localize to the plasma membrane and part of it would be in the extracellular region. Immunofluorescent staining of human cell line U-2 OS shows localization to the Golgi apparatus.

Function

Protein interactions 
C19orf18 protein has been predicted to interact with several proteins listed in the table below. The interactions have been identified and verified through affinity capture-MS. 

C19orf18 protein interacts with Nedd4 family interacting protein 1 (NDFIP1) which promotes pancreatic beta cell death reduces insulin secretion. Activin A receptor type 2A (ACVR2A) is a transmembrane receptor that is involved in ligand-binding and mediates the functions of activins. Syntaxin 6 functions in trans-Golgi network vesicle trafficking, perhaps targeting to endosomes in mammalian cells. Bone morphogenetic protein receptor type 1A(BMPR1A) is expressed almost exclusively in skeletal muscle and is a transcriptional regulator. Fibroblast growth factor receptor 2 (FGFR2) plays an essential role in the regulation of osteoblast differentiation, proliferation and apoptosis, and is required for normal skeleton development. Microfibrillar-associated protein 3 (MFAP3) has a function that is not fully understood but may be involved in nuclear signaling and may play a role in metastasis.

Clinical Significance

Disease association 
The c19orf18 protein is down-regulated in pancreatic cancer and contains CpG sites found to be replicated for association with epithelial ovarian cancer risk. The gene also decreases in expression in teratozoospermia and increases in expression in polycystic ovary syndrome. The gene may also be involved in prostate cancer and various tumors

References

External links

Genes on human chromosome 19
Transmembrane proteins